China Venture is a 1953 American adventure war film directed by Don Siegel. The plot concerns an American patrol sent into South China during World War II to rescue an important prisoner held by Chinese guerrillas.

Plot

Cast
Edmond O'Brien - Capt. Matt Reardon 
Barry Sullivan - Commander Bert Thompson 
Jocelyn Brando - Lt. Ellen Wilkins 
Leo Gordon - Sgt. Janowicz 
Leon Askin as Wu King
Lee Strasberg - Patterson 
Richard Loo - Chang Sung
Dayton Lummis as Dr. Masterson
Dabbs Greer as Galuppo
Philip Ahn as Adm. Amara
James Anderson as Cpl. Walters

External links

1953 films
1953 war films
Films directed by Don Siegel
Films set in China
Films about the United States Marine Corps
Second Sino-Japanese War films
American war films
Columbia Pictures films
American black-and-white films
1950s English-language films
1950s American films